Ice Fjord is a bay  long and  wide, entered between Weddell Point and Kade Point along the south coast and near the west end of South Georgia Island. The name is well established, dating back to about 1920. A number of features along the bay's coast, including several smaller bays, have been charted and named.

During a visit to South Georgia in 1911–12, Scottish geologist David Ferguson named two bays within Ice Fjord as North and South Bays. Since both of these names were well established for the two arms of Prince Olav Harbor, the bays were renamed in 1957 by United Kingdom Antarctic Place-Names Committee (UK-APC).  wide North Bay was renamed Narval Bay after the whale catcher Narval, while South Bay was renamed Miles Bay, after the whale catcher Don Miles, both of which were owned by the Compañía Argentina de Pesca.

Ryan Glacier flows west across South Georgia to the head of Ice Fjord. Tawny Gap extends across South Georgia from the head of Ice Fjord to a cove just south of Wales Head.

References

Bays of South Georgia